Teachers College Press is the university press of Teachers College, Columbia University. Founded in 1904, Teachers College Press has published professional and classroom materials for over a century and currently publishes 70 titles per year.

History
1889: The City of New York grants a provisional charter to found a college for the training of teachers.
1892: The New York College for the Training of Teachers changes its name to Teachers College and receives a permanent charter.
1898: Teachers College affiliates with Columbia University.
1904: The Bureau of Publications is established as the official professional publishing agency for Teachers College.
1965: The Bureau of Publications is renamed Teachers College Press.
1971: Teachers College Press is admitted into the American Association of University Presses.

Directors

Notable authors
Teachers College Press features works from authors including: 

Richard Allington, Jean Anyon, Michael Apple, Arthur Applebee, William Ayers, James A. Banks, David Berliner, Elizabeth Cohen, Linda Darling-Hammond, Eleanor Duckworth, Elliot Eisner, Richard Elmore, Reuven Feuerstein, Michelle Fine, Susan Fuhrman, Michael Fullan, Maxine Greene, Andy Hargreaves, Kevin Kumashiro, Gloria Ladson-Billings, Deborah Meier, Susan Neuman, Sonia Nieto, Nel Noddings, Marc Prensky, Seymour Sarason, Frank Smith, and Joel Westheimer.

See also

 List of English-language book publishing companies
 List of university presses

References

University presses of the United States
Columbia University